Bunodidae is an extinct family of synziphosurine chelicerates that lived in the Silurian. Bunodidae is classified inside the clade Planaterga alongside Pseudoniscidae and Dekatriata (chasmataspidids, eurypterids and arachnids). Bunodidae is composed by two genera, Bunodes (the type genus) and Limuloides.

References 

Synziphosurina
Planaterga
Silurian first appearances
Silurian arthropods
Silurian extinctions
Prehistoric arthropod families